The San Juan Bautista Parish Church (Spanish: Iglesia Parroquial de San Juan Bautista), commonly referred to as Jimenez Church, is a late-19th century, Baroque church located at Brgy. Poblacion, Jimenez, Misamis Occidental, Philippines. The parish church, under the patronage of Saint John the Baptist, is under the jurisdiction of the Roman Catholic Archdiocese of Ozamiz. The church was declared a National Cultural Treasure of the Philippines in 2001.

Parish history
The town of Jimenez was originally established by the Augustinian Recollects in 1829 and with Our Lady of the Most Holy Rosary as its patron saint. The present church, built mostly from hewn coral stone, was erected in the 19th century on a site previously settled by the Subanons, a local tribe. The erection of the church structure is attributed to Father Roque Azcona between the years 1862 to 1863. The church was believed to have been completed in the late 1880s.

Architecture
The church is predominantly Baroque in architecture with features reminiscent of the Renaissance style. The church façade, contrary to other Roman Catholic churches of the same era, is devoid of a pediment. It features a portico with three semicircular arched entrances lined on top with a parapet. The rectangular mass of the portico is crowned by three pedimented saints’ niches. Behind the façade is the nave wall with its simple, gabled roof and windows. To the left of the church stands the rectangular, three-tiered bell tower topped with finials, a domed roof and a lantern. The clock mechanism are still intact.

Interiors
The interiors of the church is reportedly one of the best preserved interior of a Roman Catholic church in Mindanao. It features a painting done in 1898 and portions made of tabique pampango, a local version of a dry wall using panels of interwoven slats or branches and covered with lime.

References

Roman Catholic churches in Misamis Occidental
Churches completed in 1829
1829 establishments in the Philippines
National Cultural Treasures of the Philippines
Spanish Colonial architecture in the Philippines
19th-century religious buildings and structures in the Philippines